Charles Palmer Nott (October 25, 1872 – December 30, 1954) was an American botanist and college football player and coach.  He was the head football coach at the University of California, Berkeley for one season, in 1897, compiling a record of 0–3–2.  He was also worked on the faculty at UC Berkeley.  Nott played college football at Brown University, where he was the captain of the Brown Bears football team in 1895.  Nott came to California in 1896 and served as a line coach under Frank Butterworth for the 1896 California Golden Bears football team.

Nott died in 1954 in Fresno, California.

Family
Nott married fellow academic and botanist Edith Sumner Byxbee.

Head coaching record

References

1872 births
1954 deaths
19th-century players of American football
American botanists
American football tackles
Brown Bears football players
California Golden Bears football coaches
University of California, Berkeley faculty
People from Colchester, Vermont